Claude-François Jeunet (1844, Recologne- 19-- ), was a French entomologist who specialised in Lepidoptera.  He studied the fauna of Doubs and Franche-Comté. Claude-Francois Jeunet was a friend of  Charles Oberthur.

References

French lepidopterists
1844 births
Year of death unknown
19th-century French zoologists
20th-century French zoologists
People from Doubs